Andrés González (born 8 April 1968) is a Peruvian footballer. He played in 18 matches for the Peru national football team from 1989 to 1996. He was also part of Peru's squad for the 1991 Copa América tournament.

References

External links
 

1968 births
Living people
Peruvian footballers
Peru international footballers
Association football forwards
Sportspeople from Callao